Springdale is the fourth-largest city in Arkansas, United States. It is located in both Washington and Benton counties in Northwest Arkansas. Located on the Springfield Plateau deep in the Ozark Mountains, Springdale has long been an important industrial city for the region. In addition to several trucking companies, the city is home to the world headquarters of Tyson Foods, the world's largest meat producing company. Originally named Shiloh, the city changed its name to Springdale when applying for a post office in 1872. It is included in the four-county Northwest Arkansas Metropolitan Statistical Area, which is ranked 109th in terms of population in the United States with 463,204 in 2010 according to the United States Census Bureau. The city had a population of 69,797 at the 2010 Census.

Springdale has been experiencing a population boom in recent years, as indicated by a 133% growth in population between the 1990 and 2010 censuses. During this period of rapid growth, the city has seen a new Shiloh Museum of Ozark History, the establishment of a Springdale campus of Northwest Arkansas Community College and the Northwest Arkansas Naturals minor league baseball team move into Arvest Ballpark. Tyson remains the city's top employer, and is visible throughout the city. Many public features bear the Tyson name, including the Randal Tyson Recreational Complex, Don Tyson Parkway, Helen Tyson Middle School, John Tyson Elementary and Don Tyson School of Innovation. Governor Mike Beebe signed an act into law recognizing Springdale as "The Poultry Capital Of The World" in 2013.

History
Springdale was formerly called "Shiloh", after the local Shiloh church, and was platted under that original name in 1866. In 1878, the town was incorporated with the name of Springdale.

An intense EF3 tornado struck the town on March 30, 2022, heavily damaging or destroying several structures and injuring seven people.

Geography
The city limits extend north into southern Benton County. Springdale is bordered by the cities of Cave Springs, Lowell, and Bethel Heights to the north, by Elm Springs and Tontitown to the west, and by Johnson and Fayetteville to the south.

The city is located in both Benton and Washington counties along Interstate 49/US Highway 62/US Highway 71 (I-49/US 62/US 71). This is the only fully controlled access route through the area, which replaced the winding US 71 (now US 71B) in the 1990s. An interstate connection with Fort Smith to the south and Kansas City, Missouri, to the north has greatly helped to grow Springdale. Within Washington County, Springdale is bordered along the south by Fayetteville and Johnson. In some locations, this transition is seamless. The city extends west and east along Highway 412 toward Tontitown and Beaver Lake, respectively.

Geology
Springdale is located on the Springfield Plateau, a subset of The Ozarks which run through northwest Arkansas, southern Missouri, and Northeastern Oklahoma. In the Springdale area, sandstone and shale were deposited on top of the Springfield Plateau during the Pennsylvanian Period. These were eroded after the Ouachita orogeny and uplift, exposing Mississippian limestone formations of the Springfield Plateau visible today.

Metropolitan area
The Northwest Arkansas region consists of three Arkansas counties: Benton, Madison, and Washington. The area had a population of 347,045 at the 2000 census which had increased to 463,204 by the 2010 Census (an increase of 33.47 per cent). The Metropolitan Statistical Area does not consist of the usual principal-city-with-suburbs morphology; instead Springdale is bordered to the north by Rogers, the south by Fayetteville, and the northwest by Bentonville, with smaller cities like Lowell and Johnson in between.

Climate
Springdale lies in the humid subtropical climate zone (Köppen Cfa) with influence from the humid continental climate type. The climate in this area is characterized by hot, humid summers and generally mild to cool winters.  The climate is similar to that of nearby Fayetteville. 

Temperatures above  are uncommon but not rare, occurring on average twice a year, with 57 days over  annually. Precipitation is weakly seasonal, with a bimodal pattern: wet seasons in the spring and fall, and relatively drier summers and winters, but some rain in all months.

Demographics

As of the census of 2010, there were 69,797 people, 22,805 households, and 16,640 families residing in the city. The racial makeup of the city was 64.7% White, 1.8% Black, 1.8% Native American, 2.0% Asian, 5.7% Pacific Islander, 22% from other races, and 2.9% from two or more races. 35.4% of the population were Hispanic or Latino of any race.

There were 22,678 households, out of which 41.9% had children under the age of 18 living with them, 53.0% were married couples living together, 13.3% had a female householder with no husband present, and 27.0% were non-families. 21.5% of all households were made up of individuals, and 8.2% had someone living alone who was 65 years of age or older. The average household size was 3.02 and the average family size was 3.54.

The median income for a household in the city was $26,523, and the median income for a family was $46,407. Males had a median income of $31,495 versus $26,492 for females. The per capita income for the city was $18,645. 21.3% of the population and 17.4% of families were below the poverty line. Out of the total population, 33.6% of those under the age of 18 and 6.3% of those 65 and older were living below the poverty line.

56.8% of Springdale's population describes themselves as religious, slightly above the national average of 48.8%. 25.6% of people in Springdale who describe themselves as having a religion are Baptist (14.5% of the city's total population). 12.5% of people holding a religion are Catholic (7.1% of the city's total population).

Marshallese population

The city is home to the largest community of Marshall Islanders in the United States, which dates to the 1980s, when one Marshall Islander arrived in the city to work for Tyson Foods and subsequently spread word of plentiful jobs to others in the islands. The Marshall Islands opened a consulate in the city in 2008. The Marshallese could easily settle in the U.S. as their country is in a free association with the United States. Photographer Lawrence Sumulong stated that this is the largest concentration of ethnic Marshallese in the United States.

2000 Census
There were 22,805 households, out of which 46.0% had individuals under 18 living with them, 53.0% were married couples living together, 13.3% had a female householder with no husband present, and 27.0% were non-families. 21.5% of all households were made up of individuals, and 7.2% had someone living alone who was 65 years of age or older. The average household size was 3.02, and the average family size was 3.54.

In the city, the population had a median age was 29.6 years. For every 100 females, there were 98.5 males. For every 100 females age 18 and over, there were 98.8 males.

2010 Census

According to the 2010 US Census, the total population was 69,797. Of this, 45,185 (64.74%) were White, 15,332 (21.97%) were some other race, 3,976 (5.70%) were Native Hawaiian or other Pacific Islanders, 2,011 (2.88%) were two or more races, 1,363 (1.95%) were Asian, 1,251 (1.79%) were Black or African American, 679 (0.97%) were American Indian or Alaska Native. 24,592 (35.38%) were Hispanic or Latino (of any race)

2020 Census

As of the 2020 United States census, there were 84,161 people, 26,443 households, and 19,475 families residing in the city.

Economy

Region
The economy of Northwest Arkansas was historically based upon agriculture and poultry. In recent decades, Northwest Arkansas has seen rapid growth and diversification of its economy based upon the three Fortune 500 companies based there—Walmart, Tyson Foods, and J.B. Hunt—while also seeing a growing University of Arkansas and cultural amenities sector. Although impacted by the Great Recession, Northwest Arkansas' economy fared better than most peer metropolitan areas, the state of Arkansas and the United States overall. Between 2007 and 2013, the region saw unemployment rates significantly below those of peer regions and the national average, while also seeing a 1% net growth of jobs. The region's gross domestic product grew 7.0% over the aforementioned time period and bankruptcies, building permits, and per capita incomes are returning to pre-Recession rates.

The professional, education, and health care sectors of Northwest Arkansas' economy have been growing steadily since 2007. Between 2007 and 2013, the region has seen a growth of 8,300 jobs in the region, with 6,100 added in education and health professions and 4,300 jobs added in the leisure and hospitality jobs related to the region's cultural amenities. The government and transportation sectors have remained relatively constant between 2007 and 2013, however the manufacturing sector has seen steady decline, mirroring national averages. The construction and real estate sectors saw large declines attributable to the poor housing market during the economic downturn.

City

Springdale has a robust poultry processing industry, including large hatcheries and/or processing plants owned and operated by Tyson Foods, Cargill, and George's throughout the city. Since Tyson Foods and George's are based in the city, a host of administrative/executive/support staff is also employed in Springdale to support these large operations. Springdale also has a variety of industrial/manufacturing employers present in the city, including Apex Tool Group, Ball Corporation, Brunner & Lay, Dayco Products, and Pratt & Whitney. This strong industrial sector differentiates the city among the four large principal cities of Northwest Arkansas.

Human resources

Education

Primary and secondary education

Springdale Public Schools is the largest school district in Arkansas, providing educational services to over 23,000 students on 29 campuses in the city. Pre-kindergarten, seventeen elementary schools, four middle schools, Springdale High School, Har-Ber High School, and the Don Tyson School of Innovation constitute the district. The district offers a variety of programs, including International Baccalaurate Programme and the (Environmental and Spatial Technology) EAST Initiative. College prep programs (academies) for Engineering and Architecture, IT, Law and Public Safety, and Medical Profession Education allow students to begin specialized instruction.

Most of Springdale, including all portions of Springdale in Washington County, is in Springdale Public Schools. Within Benton County, other districts that include sections of Springdale include Bentonville Public Schools and Rogers Public Schools.

Shiloh Christian School is a private school founded in 1976 by Cross Church. It is fully accredited by the Association of Christian Schools International and Arkansas Nonpublic School Accrediting Association. The PreK-12 student body is approximately 900 students.

A Catholic school, St. Raphael School, of the Roman Catholic Diocese of Little Rock, operated in Springdale until its 2013 closure. The nearest Catholic high school is Ozark Catholic Academy in Tontitown.

Higher education
The Northwest Technical Institute (NWTI) provides occupational training for residents of Springdale and Northwest Arkansas. NWTI also has an Adult Education Center where students earn GEDs, study English as a foreign language, and study to apply for US citizenship.

Springdale has a campus of the Northwest Arkansas Community College (NWACC). This two-year public community college provides associate degrees and non-credit courses. Ecclesia College is a small religious work college accredited through the Association for Biblical Higher Education located in western Springdale.

South of Springdale in Fayetteville, Arkansas, is the University of Arkansas. The flagship institution of the University of Arkansas System, it is the largest degree-granting institution in Arkansas, with over 200 degree programs. John Brown University, a private interdenominational Christian liberal arts college, is west of Springdale in Siloam Springs, Arkansas.

Public safety

The Springdale Police Department is the primary law enforcement agency in the city. As of 2017, Springdale had 208 police department employees, including civilian and support staff. The Springdale Fire Department is a career fire service providing emergency medical services, fire cause determination, fire prevention, fire suppression, hazardous materials mitigation, and rescue services. Springdale has been listed as an ISO Class 1 city since 2017.

Culture and contemporary life

Points of interest
Arts Center of the Ozarks
Arvest Ballpark
Fitzgerald Station and Farmstead
Shiloh Historic District
Shiloh Museum of Ozark History
Springdale Poultry Industry Historic District
The Springdale Post Office contains a 1939 Natalie Smith Henry mural, titled Local Industries, commissioned by the Treasury Department's Section of Fine Arts. Depictions of poultry and fruit farmers reflected the early industries of Tyson Foods and  Welch's Grape Juice Company. Springdale was the southwest regional headquarters of the Welch's company.

Annual cultural events
Parsons Stadium in eastern Springdale is host to many events throughout the year, most notably the Rodeo of the Ozarks. This four-day event began in Springdale in 1944 and brings professional cowboys and cowgirls to the city for one of the nation's top outdoor rodeos. Always hosted on Independence Day weekend, the event brings a parade, the Miss Rodeo of the Ozarks Pageant, and the Grand Entrance to the stadium. It also hosts Buckin' in the Ozarks (a Professional Bull Riders [PBR] event), Arenacross (a motocross competition with professional and amateur exhibitions) during Bikes Blues and BBQ weekend and other motorized exhibitions.

Sports

Springdale is home to the Northwest Arkansas Naturals, the minor league baseball team of the Texas League. The team, formerly known as the Wichita Wranglers, relocated in 2008 upon completion of Arvest Ballpark. The stadium has 6,500 seats and additional grass berm seating as well as suites and event space for private events. Approximately 70 Naturals home games are played in the stadium every year. In 2013, Arvest Ballpark hosted the 77th annual Texas League All-Star Game.

Government

Mayor–city council
Springdale operates within the mayor-city council form of government. The mayor is elected by a citywide election to serve as the Chief Executive Officer (CEO) of the city by presiding over all city functions, policies, rules and laws. Once elected, the mayor also allocates duties to city employees. Mayors serve four-year terms and can serve unlimited terms. The city council consists of eight members who together form the legislative body for the city. Also included in the council's duties is balancing the city's budget and passing ordinances. The body also controls the representatives of specialized city commissions underneath their jurisdiction. Two members are elected from each of the city's four wards. The Council meets every second and fourth Tuesday of the month at the City Administration Building.

Citizen boards, commissions, and committees
Citizen input is welcomed through the use of various specialized groups. Positions are appointed by the Mayor and approved by the City Council. Commissions include:

 Springdale Advertising and Promotion Commission
 Springdale Airport Commission
 Springdale Civil Service Commission
 Springdale Planning Commission
 Springdale Water and Sewer Commission

The Springdale Housing Authority and Springdale Public Facilities Board also help direct the City of Springdale on matters within their purview.

Springdale is represented by Republican Steve Womack Representative for Arkansas's 3rd congressional district.

Infrastructure

Transportation

Aviation
The Springdale Municipal Airport is a general aviation airport located near downtown Springdale. Commercial air service in Northwest Arkansas is available from Northwest Arkansas National Airport in Highfill.

Major highways

 Interstate 49
 US Route 62
 US Route 71
 US Route 412 Business
 US Route 71 Business
 Highway 112
 Highway 264
 Highway 265

The major through route in Springdale is Interstate 49/US 71/US 62 (the concurrent routes are unsigned and thus the route is simply known as I-49 in Springdale). This fully controlled access, four-lane expressway is a discontinuous piece of a route ultimately planned to connect Kansas City, Missouri to New Orleans, Louisiana. Formerly designated as Interstate 540 with the re-designation as Interstate 49 being granted by the U.S. Department of Transportation Federal Highway Administration in 2014, the highway became the first freeway in the area when it was completed in the 1990s to relieve the former US 71 (now US 71B) of a much-increased demand of through travelers following the unanticipated and rapid growth of Northwest Arkansas. Future plans for the I-49 corridor include completion of a freeway segment through the Ouachita Mountains to Texarkana and completion of a Bella Vista Bypass to the north.

Major north–south routes, from west to east:

 Highway 112 - This route serves as the western boundary of Springdale along much of its routing. Connecting Fayetteville to the south and Bentonville to the north while also passing through Elm Springs, the state highway is commonly used as an alternative to I-49.
 Gene George Boulevard - This road connects Don Tyson Parkway and Arvest Ballpark in southwest Springdale to Elm Springs Road
 I-49 - This Interstate is the primary route through NWA. Springdale exits include Don Tyson Parkway, Sunset Avenue (US 412), Elm Springs Road and Wagon Wheel Road. 
 40th Street - Slightly east of I-49, this surface street is used as an alternative to I-49 for local traffic.
 Carley Road - This road runs south from Sunset Ave to Johnson. 
 Gutensohn Road/Silent Grove Road - This road begins at Sunset Ave and runs north as Gutensohn Road until meeting Huntsville Ave, when it changes names to Silent Grove Road and continues north to Lowell
 Johnson Road - This road begins at Sunset Ave and runs south to Johnson.
 Thompson Street - Known as US 71B, which was the predecessor to I-49/US 71/US 62. This route is a main commercial thoroughfare as well as an unofficial neighborhood boundary in Springdale.
 Arkansas Highway 265/Old Missouri Road - This route first was used by Native Americans as the Great Osage Trail, followed by Civil War troops bound for Fort Smith, Arkansas, the Trail of Tears, the Butterfield Overland Mail stagecoach route, and later still the telegraph.

Major east–west routes, listed from south to north:

 Don Tyson Parkway - The major southern corridor in Springdale, this four-lane road was built in sections and completed in 2007. An interchange with I-49 was completed in 2014.
 US 412/Sunset Avenue/Robinson Ave - The only through east–west road in Springdale, this state highway connects Siloam Springs to the west with Huntsville in the east. Sunset Ave is the principal commercial avenue in Springdale, with dozens of hotels, restaurants and offices along the road. US 412 intersects Thompson Ave (US 71B) in midtown Springdale, and the routes briefly overlap. Following this overlap, US 412 continues east as Robinson Avenue toward Beaver Lake.
 Emma Avenue - The primary east–west street in downtown Springdale, portions are designated as historic districts. The road was formerly a through street but was broken into two segments by the construction of a new Springdale High School in 2009.
 Elm Springs Road/Huntsville Avenue - Known as Elm Springs Road near I-49, this road becomes Huntsville Road in midtown Springdale and passes through a primary industrial area.
 Backus Avenue - Connects 40th Street and Thompson Ave through a residential area.
 Randall Wobbe Lane - A short street connecting Thompson Avenue and Old Missouri Road through an industrial area.
 Wagon Wheel Road - This road is a four-lane road beginning at I-49 that runs east to the former Bethel Heights. East of Thompson Ave it is a state highway (Highway 264).
Highway 612 - Completed in 2018 and known as the Springdale Northern Bypass, this fully controlled access highway connects Highway 112 with I-49; future plans include a full bypass of the city

Public transit

The City of Springdale's major provider of public transportation is Ozark Regional Transit. The bus-based regional transit system runs throughout Washington and Benton Counties and is administrated by the Arkansas State Highway and Transportation Department (AHTD).

Notable people
 George W. Bond, educator in Springdale; later president of Louisiana Tech University
 Albert E. Brumley, southern gospel music composer, member of the Gospel Music Hall of Fame
 Kevin Carson, author and contemporary individualist anarchist and mutualist theorist
 The Duggar Family from TLC's 19 Kids and Counting.
 Jim Bob Duggar, member of the Arkansas House of Representatives from 1999 until 2002
 Jenee Fleenor, fiddle player, singer, songwriter, named 2019, 2020 and 2021 Country Music Association Musician of the Year
 Ronnie Floyd, Cross Church pastor and president of the Southern Baptist Convention from 2014 to 2016
 Joshua Frazier, former professional football player
 Kiehl Frazier, 2010 USA Today High School Football Offensive Player of the Year, Auburn University and later Ouachita Baptist University quarterback
 Megan Godfrey, Democratic politician representing Springdale in the Arkansas House from 2019 to present
 Josh Hawley, Republican U. S. Senator from Missouri
 Asa Hutchinson, Republican politician representing the Arkansas 3rd from 1997 to 2001, 46th Governor of Arkansas from 2015 to 2023
 Timothy Chad Hutchinson, lawyer in Fayetteville, Republican former member of the Arkansas House of Representatives
 Greg Leding, Democratic politician representing Fayetteville in the Arkansas House from 2011 to 2019, and part of Washington County from 2019 to present
 Gus Malzahn, former Auburn Tigers football coach and current UCF Knights football coach
 Harry L. Steele, U.S. Army major general
 John H. Tyson, chairman of Tyson Foods from 1998 to present
 John W. Tyson, founder and CEO of Tyson Foods from 1935 until his death in 1967
 Jon Woods, musician and Republican politician representing Springdale in the Arkansas House and Senate from 2007 to 2017, later convicted of fraud and money laundering
 Rhett Lashlee, former quarterback for the University of Arkansas and current offensive coordinator for Miami Hurricanes football
 Robin Lundstrum, Republican member of the Arkansas House of Representatives for Benton and Washington counties since 2015, businesswoman in Springdale
 Mitch Mustain, former Arkansas Razorbacks and Southern Cal Trojans quarterback
 Micah Neal, Republican member of the Arkansas House of Representatives from Springdale, operator of Neal's Café
 Danny L. Patrick, Republican member of the Arkansas House of Representatives from Madison and Carroll counties from 1967 to 1970
 Zack Pianalto, former professional football player
 Carolyn Pollan, Republican politician represented Sebastian County in the Arkansas House from 1975 to 1999
 Don Tyson, CEO and chairman of Tyson Foods from 1967 to 1991
 Hugh Franklin Waters, United States District Judge of the Western District of Arkansas from 1981 to 2002
 Damian Williams, former NFL wide receiver

References

External links

 
Populated places established in 1838
Cities in Benton County, Arkansas
Cities in Arkansas
Cities in Washington County, Arkansas
Northwest Arkansas
1838 establishments in Arkansas